Jennifer Leigh "Jen" Selter (born August 8, 1993) is an American Internet celebrity and fitness model. She attracted significant media attention for her debut at a young age, initially on the photo-sharing app Instagram. As of February 2023, Jen Selter had 13.6 million followers on Instagram. Selter grew up Jewish.

See also
 Instagram model

References

External links 
 
 
 Jen Selter |Head of Ambassador Program BlendJet

1993 births
Living people
American female models
20th-century American Jews
People from Roslyn Heights, New York
21st-century American Jews
20th-century American women
21st-century American women